The following is a list of Michigan State Historic Sites in Menominee County, Michigan. Sites marked with a dagger (†) are also listed on the National Register of Historic Places in Menominee County, Michigan.


Current listings

See also
 National Register of Historic Places listings in Menominee County, Michigan

Sources
 Historic Sites Online – Menominee County. Michigan State Housing Developmental Authority. Accessed January 23, 2011.

References

Menominee County
State Historic Sites
Tourist attractions in Menominee County, Michigan